Koka or Kōka may refer to:
 Ahmed Hassan Mahgoub, an Egyptian football player known as Koka.
 Kōka, a Japanese era name
 Kōka, Shiga, Japan, a city created in 2004
 Kōka, Shiga (town), Japan (dissolved and replaced by the city)
 Kōka District, Shiga, Japan (dissolved and replaced by the city)
 Kōka (効果), a type of award point in the judo rules
 Kóka, a village in Hungary
 Koka, Eritrea, a community in Eritrea
 USS Koka, U.S. Navy ships
 Koka (brand), a brand of instant noodles
 Koka Reservoir, a man-made lake in Ethiopia
 Rock-cut tombs
 Koka Subba Rao, Chief Justice of Supreme Court of India
 KOKA, a radio station serving the Shreveport-Bossier City metropolitan area
 Klava Koka, a Russian singer born 1996

See also 
 Koga (disambiguation) – The Japanese place name Kōka is alternatively pronounced Kōga
 Coka (disambiguation)
 Coca (disambiguation)